Texe William Marrs (July 15, 1944 – November 23, 2019) was an American writer and radio host, who ran two fundamentalist Christian ministries, Power of Prophecy Ministries and Bible Home Church, both based in Austin, Texas. His teachings included heavy elements of antisemitism, anti-Catholicism, Illuminati and Freemasonry conspiracy theories.

He was an officer in the United States Air Force for 20 years, reaching the rank of captain, and a faculty member at the University of Texas.

Media coverage
Marrs received coverage from the news media for his claims that:
The Oklahoma City bombing was planned and carried out by the American government. The terrorist Timothy McVeigh was framed.
Judaism is the most evil satanic cult that ever existed and Jews are conspiring to overtake the whole world through deceit and cultic worship.
Hillary Clinton is a doctrinaire Marxist who has recruited other America-hating subversives for key administration posts. Hillary Clinton also has Orwellian political ambitions. According to Marrs: "Bill Clinton is an establishment hack, a member of the traitorous Trilateral Commission, the Bilderbergers, and Council of Foreign Relations. He and Hillary are deep into Egyptian occultism and Masonic magic."
"Newt Gingrich is a closet Marxist and member of the occultic secret society known as the Bohemian Grove."
"Bob Dole is a 33rd degree Mason and a fake conservative. He's anti-Jesus Christ."
Bill Martin's plans for a Christian naturist resort is evidence that Satan is subverting Christianity.
Described as the "conspiracy theorist to end all conspiracy theorists" for his book Codex Magica: Secret Signs, Mysterious Symbols, and Hidden Codes of the Illuminati, which purports to expose a secret conspiracy between politicians and other famous people through modern history.
In his book, The Usual Suspects: Answering Anti-Catholic Fundamentalists, Karl Keating debates Marrs's claim that the Pope plans to head a one-world order.

Public behavior
Marrs has been accused of being anti-Catholic. In 1999 he alleged that former United States President  George H. W. Bush would be involved in a black mass in a chamber within the Great Pyramid of Giza during the 2000 millennium celebrations. Christian writer Constance Cumbey has accused Marrs of plagiarizing material from her book Hidden Dangers of the Rainbow.  She requested her name never be associated with Texe Marrs because of his exaggerations and blatant anti-Semitism.

Additionally, Texe Marrs has promoted a book, The Greatest Lie on Earth: Proof That Our World is Not a Moving Globe, by Edward Hendrie, which alleges that the planet Earth is immobile and flat. Marrs also offers Hendrie's book which asserts this argument through his ministry, and books by Hendrie alleging that the world is being manipulated by a vast Jewish-Catholic conspiracy.

Books

 A Perfect Name for Your Pet, Texe and Wanda Marrs, Heian, San Francisco, 1983. 
 You and the Armed Forces, ARCO, 1983. 
 Careers in Computers: The High-Tech Job Guide, Monarch Press, 1984. 
 How to Prepare for the Armed Forces Test – ASVAB, Barrons, 1984.
 Careers in High Technology, Irwin Professional Publications, 1985.
 High Tech Job Finder, Texe and Wanda Marrs, John Wiley & Sons, 1985.
 The Great Robot Book, Texe and Wanda Marrs, Julin Messenger, 1985.
 The Personal Robot Book, Robotic Industries Association, 1985. 
 High Technology Careers, Dow Jones & Irwin, 1986.
 Preparation for the Armed Forces Test, MacMillan, 1986.
 The Woman's Guide to Military Service, Texe Marrs and Karen Read, Liberty Publishing Company, 1987.
 Rush to Armageddon, Tyndale, 1987. 
 Dark Secrets of the New Age, Crossway Books, 1987. 
 Mystery Mark of the New Age, Crossway Books, 1988. 
 Futuristic Careers: Jobs Today in the 21st Century Fields, Scott Foresman & Co, 1988.
 Careers with Robots, Facts On File, 1988.
 Ravaged By The New Age, Living Truth Publishers, 1989
 Big Sister Is Watching You, Living Truth Publishers, 1993. 
 Project L.U.C.I.D.: The Beast 666 Universal Human Control System, Living Truth Publishers, 1996. 
 Codex Magica, RiverCrest Publishing, 2005. 
 Protocols of the Learned Elders of Zion (introduction) Rivercrest Publishing, 2011. 
 Conspiracy of the Six Pointed Star: Eye-Opening Revelations and Forbidden Knowledge About Israel, the Jews, Zionism, and the Rothschilds, RiverCrest Publishing, 2011. 
 Holy Serpent of the Jews: The Rabbis' Secret Plan for Satan to Crush Their Enemies and Vault the Jews to Global Dominion, RiverCrest Publishing, 2016.

Videos

 Die America Die—The Illuminati Plan to Murder America, Confiscate Its Wealth, and Make Red China Leader of the New World Order (video), RiverCrest Publishing. 
 Rothschild’s Choice: Barack Obama and the Hidden Cabal Behind the Plot to Murder America (video), RiverCrest Publishing.
 Architectural Colossus: Mysterious Monuments of the Illuminati Enshroud the World With Magic and Seduction (video), RiverCrest Publishing. 
 Where the Rich and Famous Dwell: Architectural Secrets of the Rothschilds, the Vanderbilts, the Rockefellers, the Astors, and Other Storied Bloodlines and Dynasties (video), RiverCrest Publishing.

References

Further reading

External links

Power of Prophecy: Texe Marrs' official website
Bible Home Church: Texe Marrs' internet-based church
Conspiracyworld.com: Texe Marrs' news website

Critical review of Marrs' teachings by Kerr Cuhulain
Disinformation in the ‘New Age’ – The Sad and Ugly Saga of Texe Marrs by Constance Cumbey
" (a Messianic Judaism view of Marrs)

1944 births
2019 deaths
20th-century apocalypticists
21st-century apocalypticists
American conspiracy theorists
American film producers
American male writers
Anti-Masonry
Critics of Judaism
Critics of the Catholic Church
Christian conspiracy theorists
Illuminati conspiracy theorists
North Carolina State University alumni
Park University alumni
United States Air Force officers
Writers from Austin, Texas
Military personnel from Texas